Schlotterbeck is a German language habitational surname. Notable people with the name include:
 Andreas Schlotterbeck (1982), German water polo player
 Anna Schlotterbeck (1902–1972), German political activist and writer
 Friedrich Schlotterbeck (1909–1979), German author
 Keven Schlotterbeck (1997), German professional footballer
 Nico Schlotterbeck (1999), German professional footballer
 Niels Schlotterbeck (1967), German former professional footballer

German-language surnames
German toponymic surnames